Marvin Valdimarsson (born 11 August 1981) is an Icelandic former basketball player. At the peak of his career, he was known as a high-scoring forward, leading the 1. deild karla in scoring in 2009, when he was also named as the Player of the Year, and coming in second in scoring in the Úrvalsdeild karla in 2010. After joining Stjarnan in 2010, he won the Icelandic Basketball Cup twice, in 2013 and 2015. In 2015, he won the last edition of the Icelandic Company Cup. He last played for Ungmennafélag Álftaness in 2018.

Personal life
Marvin's brother is basketball player Sæmundur Valdimarsson.

Honours

Titles
Icelandic Cup (2013, 2015)
Icelandic Company Cup (2015)
1. deild karla (2009)

Awards
1. deild karla Player of the Year (2009)

Achievements
1. deild karla scoring champion (2009)

References

External sites
Icelandic statistics 2008-present at kki.is
Úrvalsdeild statistics 2002-2007 at kki.is

Valdimarsson, Marvin
Valdimarsson, Marvin
Icelandic men's basketball players
Valdimarsson, Marvin
Úrvalsdeild karla (basketball) players
Stjarnan men's basketball players
Hamar men's basketball players